Richha is a town and a nagar panchayat in Bareilly district in the Indian state of Uttar Pradesh.Also known as [chawal nagri]. 
It has more than 74 rice industries currently and number keeps on increasing. Rice mills are flourishing in this area for many decades. Most of these are situated on the Pilibhit Road. The majority of residents are employed in these rice mills.
A community health centre was established upon the ruins of about a century old hospital near Lal Bahadur Shastri Inter College in the year 2016.

Geography
It has an average elevation of 274 metres (887 feet).

Richha is a mixture of all major castes and religions, living together peacefully. Most of the population here are Siddiquis. The majority of the Muslims followed by Hindus living together peacefully. There are many mosques and temples in the town.

References

Cities and towns in Bareilly district